Juan Leiva is the name of

 Juan Leiva (athlete) (born 1932), Venezuelan sprinter and hurdler
 Juan Leiva (footballer) (born 1993), Chilean footballer 
 Juan Carlos Leiva (born 1933), Uruguayan footballer